Yarməmmədbağı (also, Yarmamedbagy and Yarmammedbagy) is a village and municipality in the Zardab Rayon of Azerbaijan.  It has a population of 1,085.

References 

Populated places in Zardab District